The Bronx County Hall of Justice is an American courthouse at 265 East 161st Street, between Sherman and Morris Avenues in the Concourse and Melrose sections of the Bronx in New York City, New York. The ten-story building has  and includes 47 New York Supreme Court and New York City Criminal Court rooms, seven grand jury rooms, and office space for the New York City Department of Correction, New York City Department of Probation, and the district attorney.

The steel and glass building was designed by Rafael Viñoly.  Construction began in 2001, was topped out in 2002.  Sources differ on the completion date, variously stating 2006, 2007, or 2008. Originally planned as a four year construction job with a budget of $325 million, the project ended up taking six years and cost $421 million.  The original contractor was suspected of having connections to organized crime and disqualified.  There were problems with the underground parking garage, and the air conditioning system.  The New York City capital commitment plan for fiscal year 2015 also included $35.3 million for post-construction work to repair and fix items that were not properly installed during the initial construction.

The building was originally designed to be 30 stories tall, including retail space.  That design was discarded after the Alfred P. Murrah Federal Building was bombed in 1995.  Other influences of the bombing include explosive-resistant glass, a bulletproof lobby, and locating the underground garage beneath the pedestrian plaza instead of the building itself.

See also

 List of buildings, sites, and monuments in New York City

References

2008 establishments in New York City
Government buildings in the Bronx
County courthouses in New York (state)
Courthouses in New York City
Government buildings completed in 2006
Rafael Viñoly buildings
Concourse, Bronx